Sajjad Feizollahi (born September 21, 1987) is an Iranian footballer who plays for Iranjavan in the Azadegan League.

Club career
Feizollahi played with Foolad until 2010. In 2010, he joined Naft Tehran.

Club career statistics

 Assist Goals

References

1987 births
Living people
Foolad FC players
Naft Tehran F.C. players
Paykan F.C. players
Iranian footballers
Association football midfielders